All artists under SM Entertainment are collectively known as the  SM Town.

Artists

Recording artists
SM Entertainment

 Soloists

 BoA
 Kangta
 J-Min
 Taemin
 Taeyeon 
 Yoona
 Hyoyeon
 Yuri
 Sunny
 Key
 Onew
 Chen
 U-Know Yunho
 Baekhyun
 Suho
 Max Changmin
 Kai
 Wendy
 Joy
 D.O.
 Minho
 Xiumin
 Seulgi

 Groups

 TVXQ

 Girls' Generation
 Shinee
 Exo
 Red Velvet
 NCT
 Aespa

 Sub-units

 Girls' Generation-TTS
 Girls' Generation-Oh!GG
 Exo-CBX
 Exo-SC
 Red Velvet – Irene & Seulgi
 NCT U
 NCT 127
 NCT Dream

 NCT Tokyo

 Project groups

 SM the Ballad
 Younique Unit
 SM The Performance
 S
 SuperM
 Girls on Top
 Got the Beat

Actors/Actresses

 Cho Jun-young
 
 Kim Kyung-shik
 Kim Min-jong
 
 Lee Jae-ryong
 Lina
 Yoo Ho-jeong
 Kim Ji-woo
 Lami

Subsidiaries
 Source:

SM Culture & Contents (Woollim Entertainment)

KeyEast

Mystic Story

ESteem Entertainment

SM Entertainment Indonesia
 Rossa 

New Era Project
Jang Jane
Lee Soo-young

GalaxiaSM 
 Ko Jin-young
 Oh Ji-hyun
 Ahn Shin-ae
 Kim Gyu-ri
 Cho Ga-ram
 Park Hyun-kyung
 Lim Hee-jung
 Hwang Yu-rin
 Shin Eui-kyung
 Park Yoo-jun
 Baek Jin-ha
 Lee Hye-ji
 Han Chang-won
 Jang Tae-hyung
 Choo Shin-soo
 Kim Min-seok
 Woo Sang-hyeok
 Shim Suk-hee
 Kim Min-sun
 Jeong Hye-rim
 Jeong Hae-rim
 Bang Su-bin

Million Market
 MC Mong
 High Color
 Woo Taewoon
 Goopy
 Chancellor
 ChinChilla
 Moon Sujin
 Jiselle
 Coogie
 Lim Chae-eon
 Suran
 GirlNexxtDoor (GXXD)
 Minit
 Sung Dam
 SLO
 Lilly
 Park Doha
 Gary

Label SJ

 Super Junior
Super Junior-K.R.Y.
Super Junior-D&E
Kyuhyun
Ryeowook
Yesung
Heechul
Sungmin
Donghae
Eunhyuk
Super Junior-M
Zhou Mi 
Kangin 

Label V 
 WayV
 WayV - Kun & Xiaojun
 WayV - Ten & Yangyang

ScreaM Records
 DJ Hyo 
 Ginjo
 Imlay
 Raiden

All I Know Music (AIKM)
 Giant Pink
 Bray
 Duckbae
 Sohlhee

Studio artists

Producer/composer
 Young-hu Kim
 Kenzie
 Song Kwang-sik
 Hitchhiker
 Kangta
 Raiden
 GirlNexxtDoor (GXXD)
 Coach & Sendo

Korean lyricists
 Kenzie
 Misfit
 Young-hu Kim
 JQ
 Jo Yoon-kyung

Chinese lyricists
 Liu Yuan
 Wang Yajun
 Zhou Weijie
 Lin Xinye
 T-Crash
 Zhou Mi

Choreographers
 Gregory Hwang
 Shim Jae-won
 Shin Soo-jung
 Mihawk Back
 Rino Nakasone
 Kasper

Pianists
Song Kwang-sik

Former artists

Former recording artists

 Hyun Jin-young (1990–1993)
  (1991–1992)
  (1991–1992)
 Tin Tin Five (1993–2010)
 Yoo Young-jin (1995–2023)

 H.O.T. (1996–2001)
Tony Ahn (1996–2001)
Lee Jae-won (1996–2001)
Jang Woo-hyuk (1996–2001)
Moon Hee-joon (1996–2005)
 S.E.S.(1997–2002; 2016–2017)
 Shinhwa (1998–2003)
 Fly to the Sky (1999–2004)
Lee Ji-hoon (2001–2004)
 Jang Na-ra (2001–2008)
 M.I.L.K (2001–2003)
Seo Hyun-jin (2001–2007)
Park Hee-von (2001-2009)
 Kim Bo-Mi (2001-2003)
 Bae Yu-Mi (2001-2003)
 Sugar (2001–2006)
Ahyoomee (2001–2007)
Hwang Jung-eum (2001-2004)
 Black Beat (2002–2007)
 Shinvi (2002–2003)
 Isak 'N' Jiyeon (2002–2004)
Kim Isak (2002–2012)
 Chu Ga-yeoul (2002–2012)
TVXQ
 Kim Jae-joong (2003–2009)
 Park Yoochun (2003–2009)
 Kim Junsu (2003–2009)
 TraxX (2004–2019)
Rose (2004–2005)
 Attack (2004–????)
Jay (2004–2019)
Jungmo (2004–2019)
CSJH The Grace (2005-2011) 
 Stephanie (2005–2012)
 Dana (2001–2020)
 Sunday (2005–2021)
Super Junior
 Han Geng (2005–2009)
 Kim Kibum (2004–2015)

 Zhang Liyin (2006–2017)
Girls' Generation
 Jessica (2007–2015)
 Tiffany (2007–2017)
 Sooyoung (2007–2017)
 Seohyun (2007–2017)
 Shinee
 Jonghyun (2008–2017)
 Super Junior-M
 Henry (2008–2018)
 f(x) 
 Amber (2009–2019)
 Luna (2009–2019)
 Sulli (2009–2019)
 Krystal (2009–2020)
Victoria (2009–2021)
 SM the Ballad
 Jinho (2010–2015)
 EXO
 EXO-K (2012–2015)
 EXO-M (2012–2015)
 Kris (2012–2014)
 Luhan (2012–2014)
 Tao (2012–2015)
 Lay (2012–2022)
 Toheart (with Woollim Entertainment, 2014)
 SM Rookies
Herin (2015–2017)
Hansol (2013–2017)
Yiyang (2016–2018)

Former actors/actresses 
 Yoon Park (2009–2013)
 Go Ara (2003–2016)
 Lee Yeon-hee (2001–2020)
 Ki Do-hoon (2015–2022)

Notes

References 

 
SM Entertainment